Michael Vinter (23 May 1954 – 20 January 2020) was an English professional footballer who played as a forward.

Career
Born in Boston, Vinter played for Boston United, Notts County, Wrexham, Oxford United, Mansfield Town, Newport County, Gainsborough Trinity, Matlock Town, Oakham United and Hucknall Town.

He died on 20 January 2020.

References

1954 births
2020 deaths
English footballers
Boston United F.C. players
Notts County F.C. players
Wrexham A.F.C. players
Oxford United F.C. players
Mansfield Town F.C. players
Newport County A.F.C. players
Gainsborough Trinity F.C. players
Matlock Town F.C. players
Oakham United F.C. (Nottinghamshire) players
Hucknall Town F.C. players
English Football League players
Association football forwards
People from Boston, Lincolnshire
Northern Counties East Football League players